The 2014 Dayton Dutch Lions season is the club's fifth season of existence, and fourth consecutive season of playing in the third division of American soccer. The club will be playing in the USL Pro.

Roster

Competitions

Preseason

USL Pro

Table

Results summary

Match results

U.S. Open Cup

Second round

Third round

Statistics

Goals

Assists

Transfers

References 

Dayton Dutch LIons
Dayton Dutch Lions seasons
American soccer clubs 2014 season
2014 in sports in Ohio